Oranje  may refer to:

A nickname for a national sports teams of the Netherlands, especially the national football team
 Oranje, Netherlands, a village in the Dutch province of Drenthe
 The Orange River in South Africa in Dutch and Afrikaans
M.S. Oranje, a Dutch passenger ship later renamed M.S. Angelina Lauro
 Oranje Zwart, a Dutch hockey club
 In Oranje, a Dutch drama film
 Oranje, the name of one of the bastions of the Castle of Good Hope
 De Oranjes (plural of oranje, lit. "the oranges") is a shorthand term used to refer to the Dutch royal family.
 Sometimes used to refer to the Orange Free State
 Oranje, Blanje, Blou, the nickname of the Flag of South Africa (1928–1994)

See also
Orange (disambiguation), various meanings of an English spelling of Oranje
Orania (disambiguation), a homophone of Oranje

Dutch words and phrases